Corchorus erodioides is a species of flowering plant in the family Malvaceae sensu lato or Tiliaceae or Sparrmanniaceae family.
It is found only in Yemen.
Its natural habitats are subtropical or tropical dry lowland grassland and rocky areas.

References

erodiodes
Endemic flora of Socotra
Least concern plants
Taxonomy articles created by Polbot
Taxa named by Isaac Bayley Balfour
Taxobox binomials not recognized by IUCN